Viktor Fyodorovich Stepanov (21 May 1947 —  26 December 2005) was a Russian actor. He appeared in more than fifty films from 1964 to 2005.

Selected filmography

References

External links 

1947 births
2005 deaths
Russian male film actors
Soviet male film actors
Honored Artists of the RSFSR
Recipients of the Order of Merit (Ukraine), 3rd class
Deaths from bone cancer
Deaths from cancer in Ukraine